Dave Wezl (born September 22, 1984), better known by his stage name Dave Weasel is a Canadian-American stand-up comedian and writer known for his debut album I'm 30, which peaked at #1 on the Billboard Comedy Charts for 5 straight weeks, and his news satire writing in The Valley Report website.

Discography

References

1984 births
American stand-up comedians
American television writers
Living people
People from Fort McMurray
Writers from Alberta
21st-century American comedians
21st-century American screenwriters